Llano (Spanish for "Plain") is an unincorporated community located in Los Angeles County, California, near the San Bernardino County line. The town has a population of about 1,200.

Geography 
The town of Pearblossom lies to the west, while the town of Piñon Hills lies to the east. It is a few feet from the San Gabriel Mountains

Pearblossom Highway (as State Route 18), and Pearblossom Highway (as State Route 138) runs through the heart of Llano and is its 2 principal streets.

Details 
 Postal ZIP code: 93544
 County: Los Angeles
 Population: 1201
 Telephone area code: 661

History 
Llano is a name derived from Spanish meaning "plain".

Llano was once the home of English writer Aldous Huxley.

At the turn of the 20th century there were socialist colonies in Llano, the most notable being Job Harriman's Llano del Rio commune. The ruins of Llano del Rio are still extant along Highway 138 east of 165th Street East.

Notable residents
 Aldous Huxley's former home, now Pearblossom Picture Ranch, a filming location

References 

Unincorporated communities in Los Angeles County, California
Antelope Valley
Populated places in the Mojave Desert
Unincorporated communities in California